William Oliver (born 1892 – date of death unknown) was an English professional footballer who played in the Football League for Tottenham Hotspur as an outside left.

Career 
Oliver began his career at Tottenham Hotspur in 1908, before joining Walthamstow Grange the following year. The outside left re-joined Spurs in 1913 and made two appearances for the White Hart Lane club, before leaving for the second time in 1915.

Personal life 
In December 1914, four months after the outbreak of the First World War, Oliver was one of the first footballers to enlist in the Football Battalion of the Middlesex Regiment. He was deployed to the Western Front in November 1915. After just 15 days of active service, he returned to Britain after suffering a knee injury and was subsequently discharged from the army in September 1916.

Career statistics

References

1890s births
Footballers from Walthamstow
English footballers
English Football League players
Tottenham Hotspur F.C. players
Date of death missing
British Army personnel of World War I
Middlesex Regiment soldiers
Walthamstow Grange F.C. players
Association football outside forwards
Date of birth missing
Year of death missing
Place of death missing
Military personnel from Essex